The Dalarnas Fotbollförbund (Dalarna Football Association) is one of the 24 district organisations of the Swedish Football Association. It administers lower tier  football in the historical province of Dalarna.

Background 

Dalarnas Fotbollförbund, commonly referred to as Dalarnas FF, was founded on 17 April 1921 and is the governing body for football in the historical province of Dalarna, which corresponds with modern day Dalarna County. The Association currently has 91 member clubs. Based in Falun, the Association's Chairman is Lars Norman.

Affiliated Members 

The following clubs are affiliated to the Dalarnas FF:

AIKF i Borlänge
Amsbergs SK
Äppelbo AIK
Aspeboda SK
Avesta AIK
Avesta DFK
Bjursås IK
Boda Ore SK
Borlänge FK
Brittsens FK
Bullermyrens IK
Dala-Floda IF
Dala-Järna IK
Dalkurd FF
Djurmo Sifferbo IF
Envikens IF
Falu BS FK
Falu FK
Färnäs SK
Fors IK
Forssa BK
Gagnefs IF
Grycksbo IF BK
Gustafs GoIF
Hälsinggårdens AIK
Horndals IF
Hulåns IF
Husby Allmänna IK
Idre SK
IF Garparna FK
IF Noretpojkarna
IF Nornan
IF Tunabro
IF Vikapojkarna
IF Vulcanus
IFK Grängesberg FK
IFK Hedemora FK
IFK Ludvika
IFK Mora FK
IFK Rättvik FK
IFK Våmhus
IK Brage
IK Segro
Insjöns BK
Islingby IK
Korsnäs IF FK
Krylbo IF
Kvarnsvedens IK
Långshyttans AIK FK
Leksands IF FK
Ludvika FK
Malungs IF
Mockfjärds BK
Näs IF
Nås IF
Nusnäs IF
Nyhammars IF
Ornäs BK
Orsa IF FK
Sågmyra IF
Sälens IF
Samuelsdals IF
Särna SK
Säters IF FK
Selja-Långlets IK
Siljansnäs IF
Skogsbo-Avesta IF
Slätta SK
Smedjebackens FK
Söderbärke GOIF
Sollerö IF
Stora Skedvi IK FF
Stora Tuna IK
Sundborns GOIF
Sunnansjö IK
Svärdsjö IF
Swedish Somali FC
Tällbergs IF
Tofta GF
Torsångs IF
Ulfshyttans IF
Vansbro AIK FK
Venjans AIK
Vika IF
Vikarby IK
Vikmanshyttans IF
Åsens SK
Älvdalens IF FK
Älven Futsal Club
Öna SK
Östansbo IS

League Competitions 
Dalarnas FF run the following League Competitions:

Men's Football
Division 4  -  one section
Division 5  -  two sections
Division 6  -  three sections
Division 7  -  three sections

Women's Football
Division 3  -  one section
Division 4  -  one section
Division 5  -  two sections

Footnotes

External links 
 Dalarnas FF Official Website 

Dalarnas
Football in Dalarna County